Montaigne Visiting Torquato Tasso in Prison may refer to one of two paintings:

 Montaigne Visiting Torquato Tasso in Prison (Granet), an 1820 painting by François Marius Granet
 Montaigne Visiting Torquato Tasso in Prison (Richard), an 1821 painting by Fleury François Richard